Venganza is a Colombian telenovela based on the television series of Mike Kelley titled Revenge. Produced by Vista Productions Colombia, through Disney Media Networks Latin America, for RCN Televisión. The series premiered on March 6, 2017.

Plot
A terrorist attack puts Ramón Piedrahíta and his firm in charge of washing the cartel's money. Faced with this situation, he is forced to choose a scapegoat among his employees and discovers that his wife, Victoria is unfaithful to David Santana, executive in his firm. Ramón, to get revenge he buys the silence of many of his relatives and David is betrayed by the people he trusted the most, including his beloved Victoria. David is unjustly sentenced to 45 years in prison and is murdered in jail.

Thus begins the story of Amanda Santana, the daughter of David Santana, a man who was betrayed by Ramón and Victoria Piedrahita, and blamed for having been responsible for a terrorist attack on a commercial airliner. This fact destroyed Amanda's life; was separated from her father and forced to believe that she was the daughter of a murderer. When Amanda turned 18, she discovered the truth about what happened; the revelations in David Santana's diaries are the trigger of hatred and anger that move Amanda to want to destroy the lives of every person who betrayed her father. To do this, she builds her new identity, and now with the identity of "Emilia Rivera", will make all those involved in the betrayal of her father pay the consequences of their actions.

Cast 
 Margarita Muñoz as Amanda Santana / Emilia Rivera
 María Elena Döehring as Victoria Piedrahíta
 Andrés Toro as Adrián Lozano
 Guillermo Blanco as Sergio Lozano
 Jason Day as Daniel Piedrahíta
 Jacques Touckmanian as Martín Lanz
 Javier Gómez as Ramón Piedrahíta
 Greeicy Rendón as Gabriela Piedrahíta
 Sebastián Eslava as Enrique "Kike" Castaño
 Emmanuel Esparza as Cesar Riaño
 Silvia de Dios as Cristina Ochoa
 Luis Fernando Bohórquez as Vicente Salinas
 Didier van der Hove as Sebastián Arboleda
 Franártur Duque as Gael (Young executive)

Ratings

References

External links 
 

2017 telenovelas
Colombian telenovelas
2017 Colombian television series debuts
RCN Televisión telenovelas
2017 Colombian television series endings
Spanish-language telenovelas
Colombian television series based on American television series
Television shows set in Colombia
Television shows based on The Count of Monte Cristo